Deltophalonia obscura is a species of moth of the family Tortricidae. It is found in Bolívar Province, Ecuador.

The wingspan is about 21 mm. The ground colour of the forewings is brownish with dark brown markings. The hindwings are brownish cream with brownish strigulation (fine streaks).

Etymology
The species name refers to the colouration of the forewing and is derived from Latin obscura (meaning dark).

References

Moths described in 2008
Cochylini